Public holidays in the Congo could refer to: 

Public holidays in the Democratic Republic of the Congo
Public holidays in the Republic of the Congo